Puff and the Incredible Mr. Nobody is a 24-minute animated television special that first aired May 17, 1982 on CBS. The third in a series, it serves as a sequel to Puff the Magic Dragon (1978) and Puff the Magic Dragon in the Land of the Living Lies (1979), with Burgess Meredith returning as the voice of the title character. The special was produced by Fred Wolf Films and also featured the voice of David Mendenhall.

Plot
Puff finds a young boy named Terry who has an overactive imagination, and who therefore has trouble making friends with other children. Instead he has an imaginary friend; a duck wearing a saucepan with a feather as a hat named Mr. Nobody. When Terry's imagination starts to get him in trouble, Terry begins to blame Mr. Nobody for imagining the things that he has dreamed up, until he ceases to believe that he has any imagination of his own. Eventually, Mr. Nobody abandons him, and Puff must take Terry on a quest to find Mr. Nobody, teaching him along the way to embrace his creativity.

Ratings
The TV short has a rating of 7.7/10 from 64 votes on IMDb.

Voice cast
 Burgess Meredith as Puff
 David Mendenhall as Terry
 Joan Gerber as Mother/Teacher
 Bob Holt as Father
 Billy Jayne as Boy
 Diana Dumpis as Girl
 Hal Smith as Professor Katzendorfer/Bust/World
 Robert Ridgely as Mr. Nobody/Guard

References

External links 
 

American animated short films
1982 films
1982 television films
1982 television specials
1980s American animated films
1980s American television specials
Animated television specials
1982 short films
1982 animated films
CBS original programming
American television specials
CBS television specials
Animated films about dragons
Television shows written by Romeo Muller
1980s children's animated films
1980s English-language films